was a Japanese hip-hop trio from Nagoya, formed in 1996, and whose hiatus started in 2016. They are signed to Ki/oon Records, a subsidiary of Sony Music.

Biography
Home Made Kazoku is a trio, consisting of members Micro, Kuro, and DJ U-Ichi. The band was originally formed in 1996 under a different name. The band was in a state of flux with regard to membership until 2001, when they settled on becoming a trio with the name Home Made Kazoku. From 2001 to 2003, the band performed in various Nagoya nightclubs. In early 2004, the band was chosen to be part of a country-wide tour known as the Japan Club Tour. During the tour, the trio gained a large portion of their Japanese fanbase, and were also signed on by the recording company, Ki/oon Records.

Vocalists Micro and Kuro are originally from the United States. Micro spent a portion of his childhood in Kentucky, while Kuro stated that he lived in the U.S. until he was twelve in Chicago, Illinois.

Shortly after being signed on by a recording company, the group released an album containing the song "Home Sweet Home (Reborn)," which became one of the most requested songs on Japanese radio stations for the rest of the year. In July 2004, Home Made Kazoku released their first single, Summer Time Magic. Summer Time Magic ranked 15th on the Oricon record charts for nearly 10 weeks.

After a series of singles, including Thank You!!, which was used as the second ending theme for the anime Bleach, and Shōnen Heart, as well as the second opening theme for the anime Eureka Seven, the band's first full-length album was released "Rock the World". "Rock the World" entered the Oricon charts. The record was in fifth place on the Oricon chart for its first week, and would stay in top 20 for the next eight weeks. Rock the World sold 191,744 copies and became the 78th best selling album of 2005.

After their first album, the group went on several tours and concomitantly released several singles. They also released their second and third albums, "Musication" and "Familia".

Of special note, tickets to their second tour were sold out within the span of one hour, a record in Japanese music. In January 2007, it was announced that they would perform the first ending theme to the anime Naruto Shippūden entitled Nagareboshi Shooting Star which entered the Oricon charts at 10th place. One of the member, Micro, was featured on the Abingdon Boys School song "Lost Reason" as it appeared on their self-titled album.

Home Made Kazoku has performed for a promotional commercial for a product called "Walky Walky" with their song "Easy Walk". In addition, Home Made Kazoku's single, No Rain No Rainbow, is the movie theme for the second Naruto Shippūden movie.

In 2011, Home Made Kazoku returned to Naruto Shippūden for the third time with the song "FREEDOM", which was the 17th ending theme.

The band played their first show in the US at Otakon 2010 in Baltimore, MD, and returned for Otakon 2013 alongside T.M. Revolution.

Their official blog stated in August 2016 that the trio will go on indefinite hiatus by the end of the year. According to the comment by group member Micro, the group is taking a hiatus to "grow individually and take on new challenges." The group's three members will then pursue solo careers.

Style
Home Made Kazoku usually displays a very up-beat mood in their music, sometimes described by fans as "feel-good music". The pace of the songs may vary from moderately slow and calm to moderately fast and energetic. Following a trend within Japanese pop, the group makes use of English phrases within the music. This use is rather extensive, as nearly every song contains some amount of English. Most songs utilize the language in the refrain as well as in isolated instances throughout a song.

The subject matter of the music usually concerns love, family, peace, harmonious communication with others, fun, and summer festivities. Additionally, most of the music videos seem to take place in the spring or summer, hearkening back to their up-beat mood and liveliness.

When asked what they want listeners to take away from hearing their music, they responded saying that no matter where you come from or the color of your skin, we are all one big family. When asked which American artist they would most like to collaborate with, the group showed interest primarily in hip-hop and pop artists. Micro would most like to work with The Black Eyed Peas, Kuro with Stevie Wonder and U-ICHI with Jay-Z.

Discography

Albums
H.M.K.U (2001)
Mainichi ga Eiga no you na Hitokoma ～Life Is Beautiful～(2002)
Home Sweet Home (2004)
Rock the World (May 11, 2005)
musication (February 15, 2006)
Familia (March 14, 2007)
Home (October 8, 2008)
Circle (March 3, 2010)
AKATSUKI (September 28, 2011)
3RISE (September 12, 2012)
Laughin' Road (February 11, 2015)

Compilations
Heartful Best Songs (6 February 2008)
 
 
 
 
 
 
 
 
 
 
 
 
 Life goes on & on(Extended Ver.)
 Home Sweet Home(Reform)
 
 

Family Tree~Side Works Collection Vol. 1~
  1.Wait For Me(feat. Arikawa Kotomi)
  2.I Say Yeah (feat. PUSHIM,RHYMESTER,MAY J & MABOROSHI)
  3.abingdon boys school-Lost Reason (feat, Micro) 
  4.FLOW-Night Parade (feat. Home Made Kazoku)
  5.Sowelu-Let's Go Faraway (feat. Micro)(Mine-Chang Remix)
  6.SOFFet-Minus To Plus (feat. Kuro)
  7.HB-Haru No Hakuchuumu (feat. Home Made Kazoku)
  8.Noriyuki Makihara-Honno Sukoshi Dake (feat. Kuro)
  9.TUT-1026-yume tabi (feat. Micro)
 10.LITTLE-Gradation (feat. Micro,SHOGO & SMALLEST)
 11.FUN HOUSE(Fickle Remix)(feat. KAME,HOZE & TUT-1026)
 12.Shimoneta & DJ Taki-Shit-Funky Technician (feat. Home Made Kazoku)(Fickle Remix)
 13.KAME &L.N.K.-Shi GO TO Jin (feat. TUT-1026 & Micro)
 14.Aikotoba Wa Abracadabra (feat. KOME KOME Club)

Singles
 Summer Time Magic (7 July 2004)
 Summer Time Magic
 Mr. Tough Guy
 Oooh!Yeah!
 (17 November 2004)
 Aikotoba
 Hero
 Home Party
 (26 January 2005)
 Thank You!!
 Home Sweet Home (Reborn)
 On the Run (2 March 2005)
 On the Run
 Live On Direct pt.2
 Adrenaline
 (3 August 2005)
 Shōnen Heart
 Sora to Umi no Deau Tokoro
 Shōnen Heart (Instrumental)
 Joyride (5 October 2005)
 Joyride
 Manabi no Ma do
 Life Work!
 Joyride (Instrumental)
 (18 January 2006)
 Salvia no Tsubomi
 You'll Be Alright with Noriyuki Makihara
 Nani ga ta desu ka?
 Salvia no Tsubomi (Instrumental)
 You'll Be Alright with Noriyuki Makihara (Instrumental)
 (12 July 2006)
 Aikotoba wa Abra Cadabra Home Made Kazoku vs. Komekome Club
 Manatsu no Dance Call
 Precious Season
 Aikotoba wa Abra Cadabra Home Made Kazoku vs. Komekome Club (Instrumental)
 Manatsu no Dance Call (Instrumental)
I Say Yeah! (4 October 2006)
 I Say Yeah!(Micro, May J., Pushim, Kuro, C. Ricketts, S. Sasaki, J. Yamamoto)
 I Say Yeah!(DJ BOBO JAMES RMX)
 I Say Yeah!(Breakthrough Remix)
 I Say Yeah!(Fickle Remix)
 Everybody Needs Music (22 November 2006)
 Everybody Needs Music
 Silver Town
 Tera Incognita Shirarezarutochi
 What's Going On
 (31 January 2007)
 Kimi ga Kureta Mono
 Never Enough
 Salvia no Tsubomi Liga Oriente Remix
 (7 March 2007) 1st Naruto Shippūden Ending Theme
 Nagareboshi Shooting Star~
 Yonaka ni Kaita Love Letter
 Nagareboshi Shooting Star (Instrumental)
 (16 January 2008)
 Oboeteru
 Rise & Shine
 Everybody Needs Music (raw phat remix)
 Easy Walk (8 April 2008)
 Easy Walk
 
 
 No Rain No Rainbow(23 July 2008)
 No Rain No Rainbow
 
 I Wish
 Come Back Home (3 September 2008)
 Come Back Home
 
 Easy Walk (DJ Deckstream Remix)
 YOU 〜あなたがそばにいる幸せ〜 (YOU ~Anata ga soba ni Iru Shiawase~, You ~Happiness Around You) (11 March 2009)
 YOU 〜あなたがそばにいる幸せ〜
 Fun House ft. Kame (from Kame & L.N.K.), Tut-1026, & Hoze (from Smells Good)
 Clap! Clap!
 Tomorrow featuring Kusuo (4 November 2009)
 Tomorrow featuring Kusuo
 Mukaikaze (ムカイカゼ, Headwind)
 Looking for You
 Silver Town
 L.O.V.E. (10 February 2010)
 L.O.V.E.
 Step by Step
 Shōnen Heart (Fickle Remix)
 Nukumori (ぬくもり, Warmth) (27 October 2010)
 Nukumori
 Mirai Ōrai (未来オーライ)
 Nukumori (Instrumental)
 FREEDOM (1 June 2011)
 FREEDOM
 No Rain No Rainbow (Fickle Remix)
 FREEDOM (Instrumental)
 FREEDOM (Opening Mix)(Only Limited Edition)
 Kohaku Iro ni Somaru Kono Machi wa (琥珀色に染まるこの街は, Amber in This city) (January 25, 2012)
 Kohaku Iro ni Somaru Kono Machi wa
 Across the Universe
 Kibun wa Marude Jackpot! (気分はまるでJackpot!, Feeling Yourself Like A Jackpot!) (May 30, 2012)
 Kibun wa Marude Jackpot!
 Oiegei feat. Min'na-san (お家芸 feat. みんなさん)
 Love is... feat. Ms.OOJA (August 8, 2012)
 Love is... feat. Ms.OOJA
 メモリーレーン
 Kimi Ga Ita Kara (July 31, 2013)
 Kimi Ga Ita Kara
 SUMMER BORN!!!!
 Sun Shade Love
 N.A.M.A
 Kimi Ga Ita Kara(Instrumental)
 N.A.M.A.(Instrumental)
 Hashiri Tsuzukeru(October 23, 2013)
 Hashiri Tsuzukeru
 Syncopation
 Hajimari No Kane
 N.A.M.A. Remix(feat. Seamo)
 Hashiri Tsuzukeru-Instrumental-
 N.A.M.A. Remix(feat. Seamo)-Instrumental-
 Yokorenbo(January 14, 2015)
 Yokorenbo
 You Choose
 Kodona
 N.A.M.A.(Remix)(feat. Nobodyknows+)

DVDs
Live 2005 "Rock the World" ～はじめての家族旅行～ in 名古屋
Home Made Films Vol.1
Home Made Films Vol.2
Home Made Films Vol.3
I Say Yeah! NeOSITE 10th Anniversary Party@Shibuya AX 2006/10/27
Tour 2006 "Musication" ～平成十八年度・新学期家族大歓迎会～ in Zepp Tokyo
TOUR 2007 "FAMILIA" ～Heisei 19 Nendo Shiawase Kazokuka Keikaku～ in SHIBUYA AX

References

External links
Home Made Official Website

Musical groups established in 1996
Musical groups disestablished in 2016
Ki/oon Music artists
Japanese hip hop groups
Japanese pop music groups
Musical groups from Aichi Prefecture